Legislative elections were held in South Korea on 2 May 1958. The result was a victory for the Liberal Party, which won 126 of the 233 seats. Voter turnout was 87.8%.

Results

By city/province

Notes

References

Legislative elections in South Korea
South Korea
Legislative
Election and referendum articles with incomplete results